The 2007–08 Ottawa Senators season was the 16th season of the Ottawa Senators of the National Hockey League (NHL). The Senators started strongly in the regular season, but the team slumped after Christmas, and just barely qualified for the playoffs. The slump caused the Senators to fire John Paddock, who was in his first season as head coach. The Senators lost in the first round, losing in a sweep by the Pittsburgh Penguins.

Offseason
The 2007 NHL Entry Draft was held in Columbus, Ohio, on June 22–23, and the Senators used their first-round draft pick, 29th overall, to select Jim O'Brien.

Prior to the season, the Senators changed their staff, promoting Bryan Murray to general manager and John Paddock to head coach. Previous General Manager John Muckler did not accept another position with the Senators and resigned. Two players, Mike Comrie and Tom Preissing, left as free agents, and Peter Schaefer was traded to the Boston Bruins in exchange for Shean Donovan.

Pre-season
In the pre-season, a major incident occurred in the game against the Philadelphia Flyers on September 25. Early in the second period, forward Dean McAmmond was hit in the head by Steve Downie of the Flyers. Downie was given a match penalty with an automatic suspension. McAmmond was diagnosed with a concussion. Four Flyers players were eventually injured in the match, which was won by the Senators by two goals. Steve Downie was eventually suspended for 20 games for the hit, also adding a nine-game suspension from the NHL's affiliate, the American Hockey League (AHL). The Senators won all seven of their pre-season games, the only NHL team to do so that year.

Regular season
The Senators opened the regular season with two straight wins over their rivals, the Toronto Maple Leafs, in the Battle of Ontario. The season opener at Toronto ended in overtime with right winger Dany Heatley notching two goals and an assist to start the season off 1–0–0. That afternoon, Heatley also agreed to a new contract, a six-year, $45 million deal.
The Senators earned another win the following day in their home opener, with captain Daniel Alfredsson scoring two goals. Before the game, the 2007 Eastern Conference Champions banner was raised to the rafters of Scotiabank Place.

The Sens went undefeated to start the season until the streak was snapped in their sixth game with a 5–3 loss to the Carolina Hurricanes on October 11. In a later win against the Montreal Canadiens, rookie Nick Foligno scored his first NHL goal off a wrap-around attempt on goaltender Carey Price. He celebrated the goal by imitating his father Mike's signature goal celebration, a high jump.

After an 8–1 record to start the season, and with a one-week break, Head Coach John Paddock organized a team retreat to the Muskoka, Ontario, area starting on October 21. With their win over the Maple Leafs on November 6, the Senators set a team record by recording their eighth consecutive win. They also set an NHL record for the best start to a season after 14 games.

Also on November 6, six Senators were named to the All-Star Game ballot: Daniel Alfredsson, Ray Emery, Dany Heatley, Chris Phillips, Wade Redden and Jason Spezza, the most players from any one team in the NHL. As of December 5, Daniel Alfredsson trailed only Sidney Crosby in the Eastern Conference voting for forwards with 119,825 votes.

After a 4–2 win against Montreal, the Senators entered into a seven–game losing skid (0–4–3), recording three points and matching a record for straight losses set in the 1995–96 season. The Senators then rebounded with a six–game winning streak.

On January 2, 2008, Head Coach Paddock was named to coach the Eastern Conference All-Star team and Jason Spezza was named the NHL's First Star of the Month for December. On January 8, Daniel Alfredsson was named to the starting lineup for the All-Star Game, based on fan voting. He is the first Senator ever to be voted to the starting lineup. Alfredsson will be making his fifth appearance in the All-Star Game.

On January 11, Alfredsson's "CASH line" linemates, Dany Heatley and Jason Spezza, were named to the All-Star Game roster. They are the first complete line named since 1981, when the "Triple Crown" line of the Los Angeles Kings was named. However, due to Heatley's shoulder injury suffered against the Detroit Red Wings earlier in January, he did not dress in the game.

On January 24, 2008, in a game against the Tampa Bay Lightning, Daniel Alfredsson set a new team record for points in a single game, notching seven points on three goals and four assists. This topped the team record of six, done three times, the last time by Alfredsson himself against the Buffalo Sabres on November 2, 2005. A six-point game had also been done by Dan Quinn and Radek Bonk. The seven-point night put Alfredsson into the overall lead in the scoring race for the All-Star break. Moreover, Alfredsson was named the First Star of the Week on January 28. He was also named The Hockey News Player of the Week on that same day.

On January 28, Ray Emery arrived late for a practice in New York City on the first day back after the All-Star Game. Emery was subsequently fined $15,000 and the money was donated to the Children's Hospital of Eastern Ontario Foundation. Despite his team's disappointment with his behaviour, it did not stop Emery starting against the Maple Leafs in a nationally televised game, following Coach Paddock's "lose and you're out" policy of rotating his goaltenders depending on the team winning or losing, and not the goaltender's performance.

Dany Heatley returned from his separated shoulder injury after a month on injured reserve on February 7, 2008, scoring two goals in a win against the Florida Panthers.

On February 8, 2008, The Sports Network (TSN) reported that Wade Redden refused to waive his no-trade clause for a possible deal with the San Jose Sharks. Redden's agent was quoted as saying that "Redden wants to stay in Ottawa and contribute to Ottawa winning the Stanley Cup."

On February 11, the Senators made a trade with the Carolina Hurricanes sending defenceman Joe Corvo and forward Patrick Eaves in exchange for forward Cory Stillman and defenceman Mike Commodore in a trade for "Stanley Cup experience", according to General Manager Bryan Murray. Also that day, the NHL announced that Jason Spezza was named First Star of the Week after recording 11 points in the previous week's three games.

On February 27, after a prolonged slump through January and February during which the Senators won only 7 of 21 games, Murray fired Head Coach Paddock and Assistant Coach Ron Low, taking over the coaching duties himself. Both Low and Paddock were offered other jobs within the organization. Murray said he told them to call him in a few weeks.

The Senators trailed the Buffalo Sabres 3–1 on March 25, 2008, with under eight minutes to play in the third period but scored five unanswered goals to win 6–3. It was only the third time in NHL history that a team scored six-or-more goals in a game despite scoring no more than one goal through the first 52:00.

The team remained upbeat after the poor play and coaching change. Alfredsson appeared on the cover of the April 1 issue of The Hockey News, proclaiming "Don't Count Us Out." This was his seventh appearance on the cover of the magazine. The article interviewed Alfredsson, Fisher and Murray, and discussed the up-and-down play of the team, and its defensive play which has allowed more goals than previous seasons. Wayne Gretzky was quoted about the team: "This might mature them as a team going through this tough patch."

Entering the final week of play, the Senators needed three points in three games to guarantee a playoff position ahead of the Washington Capitals, who held an edge in a tie-breaker between the teams. In the first game, Montreal would defeat the Senators 3–0. According to The Globe and Mail, before the next game on April 3 in Toronto, Ottawa employed the use of sports psychologist Dr. Max Offenberger. The Senators defeated the Maple Leafs 8–2 and Antoine Vermette scored a hat-trick. Three of the Senators' goals were scored short-handed; it was the third time in franchise history that the Senators had scored three short-handed goals in a single game, with the two previous games being a 5–2 home win against the Florida Panthers on November 18, 2000, and a 7–2 road win over the Pittsburgh Penguins on February 2, 2006. However, they lost Alfredsson and Fisher to injuries, adding to Chris Kelly, who was already sidelined. The Capitals continued to win, and it came down to the Senators final game, on April 4 at home against the Boston Bruins, needing one point to clinch a spot. Despite a 2–1 Senators' loss that night, the Carolina Hurricanes fell to the Florida Panthers and the Senators clinched a playoff berth for the 11th-straight season.

On April 6, the final day of the season, the Pittsburgh Penguins played the Philadelphia Flyers to decide the final seedings and lost 2–0, drawing the Senators as first round opponents. According to Phil Sheridan of The Philadelphia Inquirer, it appeared deliberate:
"Two days after Double Clinch Friday came Letdown Sunday. Fans who filled the Wachovia Center expecting a fresh installment of There Will Be Blood got stuck watching Farce of the Penguins instead.

No Sidney Crosby, not much effort. The Pittsburgh Penguins paid the Flyers a huge compliment yesterday. They made it embarrassingly clear that they preferred to face the Ottawa Senators in the first round of the playoffs. After skating through the motions of a 2–0 loss to Philadelphia, the Pens will indeed face the Sens."

Excluding three shootout-winning goals, the Senators scored 258 goals during the regular season, the most among all 30 teams. They also scored the most shorthanded goals, with 18.

Divisional standings

Conference standings

Schedule and results

|-  style="text-align:center; background:#cfc;"
| 1 || October 3 || @ Toronto || 4 – 3 (OT) || 19,476 || 1-0-0
|-  style="text-align:center; background:#cfc;"
| 2 || October 4|| Toronto || 3 – 2 || 19,857 || 2-0-0
|-  style="text-align:center; background:#cfc;"
| 3 || October 6 || NY Rangers || 2 – 0 || 19,336 || 3-0-0
|-  style="text-align:center; background:#cfc;"
| 4 || October 8 || New Jersey || 4 – 2 || 18,260 || 4-0-0
|-  style="text-align:center; background:#cfc;"
| 5 || October 10 || @ Atlanta || 3 – 1 || 12,751 || 5-0-0
|-  style="text-align:center; background:#fbb;"
| 6 || October 11 || Carolina || 5 – 3 || 18,268 || 5-1-0
|-  style="text-align:center; background:#cfc;"
| 7 || October 13 || @ NY Rangers || 3 – 1 || 18,200 || 6-1-0
|-  style="text-align:center; background:#cfc;"
| 8 || October 18 || Montreal || 4 – 3 || 20,019 || 7-1-0
|-  style="text-align:center; background:#cfc;"
| 9 || October 20 || Florida || 4 – 1 || 19,904 || 8-1-0
|-  style="text-align:center; background:#cfc;"
| 10 || October 27 || @ New Jersey || 4 – 1 || 17,625 || 9-1-0
|-

|-  style="text-align:center; background:#cfc;"
|11 || November 1 || Atlanta || 4 – 6 || Ottawa || || Emery || 18,538 || 10–1–0 || 20
|-  style="text-align:center; background:#cfc;"
|12 || November 3 || Boston || 2 – 3 || Ottawa || || Gerber || 19,939 || 11–1–0 || 22
|-  style="text-align:center; background:#cfc;"
|13 || November 4 || Ottawa || 2 – 1 || Boston || SO || Gerber || 10,087 || 12–1–0 || 24
|-  style="text-align:center; background:#cfc;"
|14 || November 6 || Toronto || 1 – 5 || Ottawa || || Gerber || 19,613 || 13–1–0 || 26
|-  style="text-align:center; background:#fbb;"
|15 || November 8 || Washington ||4 – 1 || Ottawa || || Emery || 19,666 || 13–2–0 || 26
|-  style="text-align:center; background:#cfc;"
|16 || November 10 || Montreal || 1 – 3 || Ottawa || || Gerber || 20,065 || 14–2–0 || 28
|-  style="text-align:center; background:#cfc;"
|17 || November 15 || Buffalo || 2 – 3 || Ottawa || || Gerber || 19,279 || 15–2–0 || 30
|-  style="text-align:center; background:#fbb;"
|18 || November 17 || Ottawa || 0 – 3 || Toronto || || Gerber || 19,596 || 15–3–0 || 30
|-  style="text-align:center; background:#cfc;"
|19 || November 19 || Ottawa || 4 – 2|| Montreal || || Gerber || 21,273 || 16–3–0 || 32
|-  style="text-align:center; background:#fbb;"
|20 || November 21 || Ottawa ||2 – 4 || Buffalo || ||Emery ||18,690 || 16–4–0 || 32
|-  style="text-align:center; background:#fff;"
|21 || November 22 || Pittsburgh || 6 – 5 || Ottawa || SO || Gerber || 20,061 || 16–4–1 || 33
|-  style="text-align:center; background:#fbb;"
|22 || November 24 || Philadelphia || 4 – 3|| Ottawa || || Emery || 20,128 || 16–5–1 || 33
|-  style="text-align:center; background:#fff;"
|23 || November 28|| Ottawa || 2 – 3 || NY Islanders || SO || Emery || 9,211  || 16–5–2 || 34
|-  style="text-align:center; background:#fbb;"
|24 || November 29 || Nashville || 6 – 5 || Ottawa || || Gerber || 19,538 || 16–6–2 || 34
|-

|-  style="text-align:center; background:#fbb;"
|25 || December 1 || NY Rangers || 5 – 2|| Ottawa || || Gerber || 20,003 || 16–7–2 || 34
|-  style="text-align:center; background:#fff;"
|26 || December 4 || Ottawa || 3 – 4 || Tampa Bay || SO || Emery || 17,540 || 16–7–3 || 35
|-  style="text-align:center; background:#cfc;"
|27 || December 5 || Ottawa || 5 – 4 || Florida || || Emery || 11,289 || 17–7–3 || 37
|-  style="text-align:center; background:#cfc;"
|28 || December 7 || Ottawa || 4 – 2 || Dallas || || Emery || 18,016 || 18–7–3 || 39
|-  style="text-align:center; background:#cfc;"
|29 || December 12 || Ottawa || 6 – 0 || Carolina || || Emery || 15,268 || 19–7–3 || 41
|-  style="text-align:center; background:#cfc;"
|30 || December 13 || Ottawa || 4 – 1 || Pittsburgh || || Gerber || 16,982 || 20–7–3 || 43
|-  style="text-align:center; background:#cfc;"
|31 || December 15 || Atlanta || 3 – 7 || Ottawa || || Gerber || 20,082 || 21–7–3 || 45
|-  style="text-align:center; background:#cfc;"
|32 || December 18 || Ottawa || 3 – 2 || Boston || || Gerber || 14,874 || 22–7–3 || 47
|-  style="text-align:center; background:#fbb;"
|33 || December 20 || Ottawa || 2 – 3 || Atlanta || || Gerber || 14,085 || 22–8–3 || 47
|-  style="text-align:center; background:#fff;"
|34 || December 22 || Chicago || 4 – 3 || Ottawa || OT || Emery|| 20,171 || 22–8–4 || 48
|-  style="text-align:center; background:#cfc;"
|35 || December 23 || Ottawa || 3 – 1 || NY Rangers || || Gerber || 18,200 || 23–8–4 || 50
|-  style="text-align:center; background:#cfc;"
|36 || December 26 || Ottawa || 5 – 3 || Buffalo || || Gerber || 18,690 || 24–8–4 || 52
|-  style="text-align:center; background:#cfc;"
|37 || December 27 || NY Islanders || 2 – 5 || Ottawa || || Gerber || 20,268 || 25–8–4 || 54
|-  style="text-align:center; background:#fbb;"
|38 || December 29 || Washington || 8 – 6 || Ottawa || || Gerber || 20,296 || 25–9–4 || 54
|-
| colspan=10 style="font-size:88%;"| Emery had to leave this game with a sore hip at the 5:24 mark of the 1st period, but was credited with the win because he was in the net when the game-winning goal was scored. Neither Gerber or Emery will get the shutout included in their stats because it was shared.
|-

|-  style="text-align:center; background:#fbb;"
| 39 ||  January 1 || Ottawa || 3 – 6 || Washington || || Emery || 14,547 || 25–10–4 || 54
|-  style="text-align:center; background:#cfc;"
| 40 || January 4 || Ottawa || 5 – 3 || Buffalo || || Emery || 18,690 || 26–10–4 || 56
|-  style="text-align:center; background:#cfc;"
| 41 || January 5 || Tampa Bay || 3 – 4 || Ottawa || OT || Emery || 20,108 || 27–10–4 || 58
|-  style="text-align:center; background:#cfc;"
| 42 || January 10 || Buffalo || 2 – 3 || Ottawa || SO || Gerber || 19,843 || 28–10–4 || 60
|-  style="text-align:center; background:#cfc;"
| 43 || January 12 || Detroit || 2 – 3 || Ottawa || || Emery || 20,208 || 29–10–4 || 62
|-  style="text-align:center; background:#fbb;"
| 44 || January 13 || NY Islanders || 3 – 1 || Ottawa || || Gerber || 19,804 || 29–11–4 || 62
|-  style="text-align:center; background:#fbb;"
| 45 || January 15 || Ottawa || 2 – 4 || Washington || || Emery || 15,261 || 29–12–4 || 62
|-  style="text-align:center; background:#cfc;"
| 46 || January 17 || Carolina || 1 – 5 || Ottawa || || Gerber || 19,720 || 30–12–4 || 64
|-  style="text-align:center; background:#fbb;"
| 47 || January 19 || Tampa Bay || 2 – 0 || Ottawa || || Emery || 20,091 || 30–13–4 || 64
|-  style="text-align:center; background:#fbb;"
| 48 || January 20 || Ottawa || 1 – 6 || Philadelphia || || Gerber || 19,742 || 30–14–4 || 64
|-  style="text-align:center; background:#fbb;"
| 49 || January 22 || Ottawa || 3 – 5 || Florida || || Emery || 12,794 || 30–15–4 || 64
|-  style="text-align:center; background:#cfc;"
| 50 || January 24 || Ottawa || 8 – 4 || Tampa Bay || || Gerber || 16,346 || 31–15–4 || 66
|-  style="text-align:center; background:#cfc;"
| 51 || January 29 || Ottawa || 5 – 2 || NY Islanders || || Gerber || 9,546 || 32–15–4 || 68
|-  style="text-align:center; background:#fbb;"
| 52 || January 31 || Boston || 4 – 1 || Ottawa || || Gerber || 19,959 || 32–16–4 || 68
|-

|-  style="text-align:center; background:#fbb;"
| 53 || February 2 || Ottawa || 2 – 4|| Toronto || || Emery || 19,543 || 32–17–4 || 68
|-  style="text-align:center; background:#fbb;"
| 54 || February 5 || Ottawa || 3 – 4 || Montreal || || Gerber || 21,273 || 32–18–4 || 68
|-  style="text-align:center; background:#cfc;"
| 55 || February 7 || Florida || 4 – 5 || Ottawa || ||Emery || 19,435 || 33–18–4 || 70
|-  style="text-align:center; background:#cfc;"
| 56 || February 9 || Montreal || 1 – 6 || Ottawa || || Emery || 20,297 || 34–18–4 || 72
|-  style="text-align:center; background:#fbb;"
| 57 || February 12 || Buffalo ||5 – 1 || Ottawa ||  || Emery ||19,564 ||34–19–4 || 72
|-  style="text-align:center; background:#fff;"
| 58 || February 13 || Ottawa || 2 – 3 || New Jersey || OT || Gerber || 12,339 || 34–19–5 || 73
|-  style="text-align:center; background:#fbb;"
| 59 || February 16 || New Jersey || 3 – 2 || Ottawa || || Emery || 20,201 || 34–20–5 || 73
|-  style="text-align:center; background:#cfc;"
| 60 || February 19 || Philadelphia || 2 – 3 || Ottawa || SO || Emery || 19,729 || 35–20–5 || 75
|-  style="text-align:center; background:#fff;"
| 61 || February 21 || Columbus || 3 – 2 || Ottawa || SO || Emery || 19,612 || 35–20–6 || 76
|-  style="text-align:center; background:#cfc;"
| 62 || February 23 || Ottawa || 4 – 3 || Pittsburgh || OT || Emery || 17,132 || 36–20–6 || 78
|-  style="text-align:center; background:#fbb;"
| 63 || February 25 || Toronto || 5 – 0 || Ottawa || || Emery || 19,861 || 36–21–6 || 78
|-  style="text-align:center; background:#fbb;"
| 64 || February 26 || Ottawa || 0 – 4 || Boston || || Gerber || 13,451 || 36–22–6 || 78
|-  style="text-align:center; background:#fbb;"
| 65 || February 28 || Ottawa || 1 – 3 || Philadelphia || || Emery || 19,567 || 36–23–6 || 78
|-

|-  style="text-align:center; background:#cfc;"
| 66 || March 1 || Pittsburgh || 4 – 5 || Ottawa || || Gerber || 20,153 || 37–23–6 || 80
|-  style="text-align:center; background:#fbb;"
| 67 || March 3 || Ottawa || 1 – 3 || Anaheim || || Gerber || 17,174 || 37–24–6 || 80
|-  style="text-align:center; background:#fff;"
| 68 || March 5 || Ottawa || 2 – 3 || San Jose || OT || Gerber || 17,496 || 37–24–7 || 81
|-  style="text-align:center; background:#fbb;"
| 69 || March 6 || Ottawa || 0 – 2 || Los Angeles || || Gerber || 17,580 || 37–25–7 || 81
|-  style="text-align:center; background:#cfc;"
| 70 || March 8 || Ottawa || 4 – 2 || Phoenix || || Gerber || 16,922 || 38–25–7 || 83
|-  style="text-align:center; background:#cfc;"
| 71 || March 11 || Boston || 1 – 4 || Ottawa || || Gerber ||20,143||39–25–7 ||85
|-  style="text-align:center; background:#cfc;"
| 72 || March 13 || Ottawa || 3 – 0 || Montreal || || Gerber || 21,273 || 40–25–7 || 87
|-  style="text-align:center; background:#fbb;"
| 73 || March 16 || Ottawa || 1 – 5 || Carolina || || Gerber || 18,680 || 40–26–7 || 87
|-  style="text-align:center; background:#cfc;"
| 74 || March 20 || St. Louis || 2 – 3|| Ottawa || || Gerber || 20,027 || 41–26–7 || 89
|-  style="text-align:center; background:#fbb;"
| 75 || March 22 || Toronto || 5 – 4 || Ottawa || || Gerber || 20,183 || 41–27–7 || 89
|-  style="text-align:center; background:#fbb;"
| 76 || March 24 || Ottawa || 5 – 7 || Montreal || || Emery || 21,273 || 41–28–7 || 89
|-  style="text-align:center; background:#cfc;"
| 77 || March 25 || Ottawa || 6 – 3 || Buffalo || || Gerber || 18,690 || 42–28–7 || 91
|-  style="text-align:center; background:#fff;"
| 78 || March 27 || Buffalo || 4 – 3 || Ottawa || SO || Gerber || 19,883 || 42–28–8 || 92
|-  style="text-align:center; background:#fbb;"
| 79 || March 29 || Ottawa || 0 – 4 || Boston || || Gerber || 17,565 || 42–29–8 || 92
|-

|-  style="text-align:center; background:#fbb;"
| 80 || April 1 || Montreal || 3 – 0 || Ottawa || || Gerber || 20,326 || 42–30–8 || 92
|-  style="text-align:center; background:#cfc;"
| 81 || April 3 || Ottawa || 8 – 2 || Toronto || || Gerber || 19,466 || 43-30-8 || 94
|-  style="text-align:center; background:#fbb;"
| 82 || April 4 || Boston || 2 – 1 || Ottawa || || Gerber || 20,232 || 43-31-8 || 94
|-

|

Playoffs
The Ottawa Senators clinched a playoff spot for the eleventh consecutive time (minus the lockout), finishing second in the Northeast Division, and seventh in the Eastern Conference. The Senators faced the Pittsburgh Penguins in the Eastern Conference Quarter-final and lost the series 4–0. The result led to speculation in the media that Ray Emery's contract would be bought out and free agents Mike Commodore, Martin Lapointe, Wade Redden, Luke Richardson and Cory Stillman would not return for the 2008–09 season. GM Bryan Murray was given a public endorsement by Owner Eugene Melnyk and was expected to return for next season. On April 18, Murray confirmed to the media in an end-of-season press conference that Emery would not return: "My plan is not to have him back."

|-  style="text-align:center; background:#fbb;"
| 1 || April 9 || Ottawa || 0 – 4 || Pittsburgh ||  || Gerber || 17,132 || Penguins lead 1–0
|-  style="text-align:center; background:#fbb;"
| 2 || April 11 || Ottawa || 3 – 5  || Pittsburgh || || Gerber || 17,132 || Penguins lead 2–0
|-  style="text-align:center; background:#fbb;"
| 3 || April 14 || Pittsburgh || 4 – 1  || Ottawa ||  || Gerber || 19,961 || Penguins lead 3–0
|-  style="text-align:center; background:#fbb;"
| 4 || April 16 || Pittsburgh || 3 – 1 || Ottawa ||  || Gerber  || 19,954 || Penguins win series 4–0
|-

Player statistics

Regular season
Scoring

Stillman and Commodore totals only include time with Senators.

Goaltending

Playoffs
Scoring

Goaltending

Awards and records
 Molson Cup – Martin Gerber

Records
 On November 6, 2007, the Ottawa Senators set a new franchise record for most consecutive wins (8) with a 5–1 victory over the Toronto Maple Leafs. They also set an NHL record for most points accumulated (26) after 14 games played, going 13–1–0 in that span.
 On January 24, 2008, Senators' captain Daniel Alfredsson broke the franchise record for most points in a game by one player by scoring 3 goals + 4 assists for 7 points in an 8–4 romp over the Tampa Bay Lightning. The three goals were scored in three different ways: One was scored 5–on-5, another was scored on a powerplay and the final goal of the hat-trick was scored shorthanded.
 On February 19, 2008, the Ottawa Senators set a new franchise record in shootout wins by winning their third by a score of 3–2 against the Philadelphia Flyers.
 On April 11, 2008, Martin Gerber broke the franchise record for most saves made in a playoff game, by stopping 49 out of 53 shots against the Pittsburgh Penguins in Game 2 of the Eastern Conference Quarterfinals.

Milestones
 On December 5, 2007, the Ottawa Senators celebrated their 500th franchise win with a 5–4 victory over the Florida Panthers.
 On February 6, 2008, the Ottawa Senators suffered their 500th franchise defeat without an earning a point in a 4–3 loss to the Montreal Canadiens.

Transactions
The Senators have been involved in the following transactions during the 2007–08 season.

Trades

Free agents

Free agent acquisitions

Players lost to free agency

Draft picks
Ottawa's picks at the 2007 NHL Entry Draft in Columbus, Ohio.

Farm teams
 Binghamton Senators (American Hockey League)

See also
 2007–08 NHL season

References
 

Notes

Ottawa
Ottawa Senators seasons
Ott